Binh Thuan Football Club, simply known as Binh Thuan, is a Vietnamese football club based in Phan Thiet, Binh Thuan . The team currently plays in the V.League 2 and has its home ground at Phan Thiet Stadium.

History
In the 1994 season, Binh Thuan Club participated in the National A1 football tournament. The team faced Hanoi Police in the final match at Pleiku Stadium. After 120 minutes of play, the two teams drew 2-2. Binh Thuan lost in the 6th penalty shootout, missed the opportunity to participate in the National Football Tournament of Strong Teams.

2016 continues to be an unsuccessful season for Binh Thuan. Although the goal of relegation is completed, the playing style of the players has many problems. During the entire season, the club was always in the top "holding the red light" with a very high risk of relegation when only a few points above the bottom team. In 12 matches, the team won only 2 matches, drew 6 and lost 4, ranked 5th overall in the qualifying round of Group A. Binh Thuan team had the least number of goals among 14 participating teams when they only scored 8 table. This is the lowest record ever in the team's history.

2017 season ,fter 14 rounds, Binh Thuan ranked 2nd in Group B with 27 points, winning the right to participate in the final round. In the first match of the final round, the club won a minimal victory over Lam Dong thanks to Trinh Duc Bon's only goal. The next two matches, the team continuously lost 0–3 to Cong An Nhan Dan and 0-3 first Hà Nội B. The club must play a play-off match to win promotion. Here, the team lost 1–2 to Dong Thap , continuing to miss the opportunity to promote

In the 2022 season, Binh Thuan won 23 points after 12 rounds, winning the right to participate in the final round of the tournament, facing Hai Nam Vinh Yen Vinh Phuc club. At the final match held on June 8, 2022, at 19 August Stadium, Nha Trang, Khanh Hoa. In the 33rd minute of the match, player Ngo Anh Vu from Binh Thuan side had an error with an opponent player. Referee Tran Ngoc Nho showed the midfielder a second yellow card, meaning he was disqualified. Disagreeing with that decision, Ngo Anh Vu rushed into assault, threatened and punched referee Tran Ngoc Nho. Everything ended only after the security forces and the coaching staff of the two teams intervened. Binh Thuan was leading 2-0 and played at a loss after 45 minutes of play. However, in the second half, two goals from Nguyen Dinh Loi in the 56th minute and Thanh Hung in the 77th minute helped the team equalize the score. After 120 minutes of play, the two teams were still tied with a score of 2-2. In the end, Binh Thuan won on penalties with a score of 8–7, thereby gaining the right to play in the 2023 V.League 2 after nearly 30 years.

List of coaches

Formation

Present 
By the end of the season 2022

Former player

References

Football clubs in Vietnam